The women's doubles Tournament at the 2007 Internazionali Femminili di Palermo took place between 16 and 22 July on outdoor clay courts in Palermo, Italy. Mariya Koryttseva and Darya Kustova won the title, defeating Alice Canepa and Karin Knapp in the final.

Seeds

Draw

References
 Main Draw

Internazionali Femminili di Palermo - Doubles